The Guzmán Family Pantheon (Spanish: Panteón de la Familia Guzmán), also known as the Guzmán Hermitage (Ermita Guzmán), is a single story, lime-stuccoed, brick masonry funerary chapel located in Humacao Pueblo (downtown Humacao), in the Puerto Rican municipality of the same name. The structure was built in 1864 the Eclectic style, with Classic, Renaissance and Exotic architectural elements.

The so-called Ermita Guzman, built in 1864, was originally built as a funerary pantheon to house the mortal remains of the Guzman family. It is possible that it was also originally intended to house the celebration of certain religious activities to honor their memory.

The chapel was added to the National Register of Historic Places in 1995.

Gallery

See also 
 Panteón Otero-Martínez: NRHP listing in Vega Baja, Puerto Rico
 National Register of Historic Places listings in eastern Puerto Rico

References 

National Register of Historic Places in Humacao, Puerto Rico
Buildings and structures on the National Register of Historic Places in Puerto Rico
1864 establishments in Puerto Rico
Buildings and structures completed in 1864
Death in Puerto Rico
Chapels in North America
Mausoleums on the National Register of Historic Places